Eaton is an English surname, and may refer to:

Academics and scientists 
 Alfred Edwin Eaton (1845–1929), English clergyman and entomologist
 Amos Eaton (1776–1842), American scientist and educator, whose standard abbreviation as a botanist is Eaton
 Daniel Cady Eaton (1834–1895), American botanist
 Elon Howard Eaton (1866–1934), American ornithologist, scholar, and author
 Nathaniel Eaton (1610–1674), first schoolmaster of Harvard College
 Suzanne Eaton (1959–2019), American scientist and academic

Arts 
 Andrew Eaton (born 1960), British film producer
 Brando Eaton (born 1986), American film and television actor
 Charles Warren Eaton (1857–1937), American landscape artist
 Chris Eaton (born 1971), Canadian musician
 Cleveland Eaton (1939–2020), American jazz double bassist
 David Eaton (composer) (born 1949), American composer and conductor
 Edith Maude Eaton, American-Chinese author
 Evelyn Eaton (1902–1983), Canadian-American novelist and poet
 Fanny Eaton (1835–1924), Jamaican-born artists model
 Gerald Eaton, Canadian singer
 Jay Eaton (1899–1970), American character actor 
 Jeff Eaton, American musician in the band Split Lip Rayfield
 Jonathan Eaton, American economist
 Mary Eaton (1901–1948), American actress
 Mary Emily Eaton (1873–1961), English botanical artist
 Meredith Eaton (born 1974), American actress
 Pearl Eaton (1898–1958), American actress
 Sally Eaton (born 1947), Wiccan High Priestess, liturgist, singer and actress
 Shirley Eaton (born 1937), British actress
 William J. Eaton (1930–2005), American journalist
 William Eaton, guitarist and luthier
 Winnifred Eaton (1875–1954), Canadian author
 Wyatt Eaton (1849–1896), Canadian-American portrait painter

Business 
 Cyrus S. Eaton (1883–1979), Canadian-born American financier, industrialist and philanthropist
 Henry Eaton, 1st Baron Cheylesmore (1816–1891), British businessman and Conservative politician
 Hubert Eaton (1881–1966), American businessman
 Joseph Oriel Eaton II (1873–1949), founder of the Eaton Corporation of the United States
 Robert James Eaton (born 1940), Chairman of the Chrysler Corporation
 Roger Eaton, President and Chief Concept Officer of Kentucky Fried Chicken (KFC)
 Timothy Eaton (1834–1907), founder of the Eaton's department store chain
 Eaton family (Toronto), family and descendants of Timothy Eaton

Military 
 Brian Eaton (1916–1992), senior officer in the Royal Australian Air Force
 Charles Eaton (RAAF officer) (1895–1979), senior officer in the Royal Australian Air Force
 Daniel Isaac Vernon Eaton (1869–1917), Canadian military officer
 John Eaton (general) (1829–1906), Union American Civil War general
 Herbert Eaton, 3rd Baron Cheylesmore (1848–1925), British Army officer, sportsman, and peer
 Kenneth Eaton (1934–2022), Royal Navy admiral
 Paul Eaton (born 1950), US general, best known for his command of operations to train Iraqi troops during Operation Iraqi Freedom
 Pinketham Eaton (died 1781), officer in the North Carolina Continental Line, American Revolutionary War
 William Eaton (soldier) (1764–1811), United States Army general who served as a soldier during the Barbary Wars

Public service 
 Amasa Eaton (1841-1914), American lawyer and politician
 Barney Augustus Eaton (1853–1936), Wisconsin state legislator
 Benjamin Harrison Eaton (1833–1904), American politician, entrepreneur and agriculturalist
 C. N. Eaton (1887–1978), American politician
 Charles Aubrey Eaton (1868–1953), Canadian-born American clergyman and politician
 Chris Eaton (born 1952), Australian police officer best known as a sports betting investigator
 Dorman Bridgman Eaton (1823–1899), a U.S. civil service reformer
 Fred Eaton (1856–1934), mayor of Los Angeles
 Fredrik Stefan Eaton (born 1938), Canadian businessman and diplomat
 Horace Eaton (1804–1855), American politician
 John Eaton (politician) (1790–1856), U.S. Senator and Secretary of War, 19th century
 Nicole Eaton (born 1945), Canadian politician
 Robert G. Eaton (1937–2009), politician and cabinet minister in Ontario
 Rosanell Eaton (1921–2018), American activist
 Theophilus Eaton (1590–1658), first governor of New Haven Colony, Connecticut
 William W. Eaton (1816–1898), American politician from Connecticut

Sports 
 Adam Eaton (pitcher) (born 1977), American baseball player
 Adam Eaton (outfielder) (born 1988), American baseball player
 Ashton Eaton (born 1988), American decathlete
 Aileen Eaton (1909–1987), Canadian born American boxing promoter
 Barry Eaton, English rugby league footballer who played in the 1990s and 2000s, and coached in the 2000s and 2010s
 Bobby Eaton (1958–2021), American professional wrestler
 Chris Eaton (tennis) (born 1987), British tennis player
 David Eaton (gymnast) (born 1980), Welsh gymnast
 George Eaton (born 1945), Canadian race driver and president of Eaton's
 Jason Eaton (born 1982), New Zealand rugby union footballer
 Kaitlyn Eaton (born 1994), American wheelchair basketball player
 Lloyd Eaton (1918–2007), American football player, coach, and executive
 Mark Eaton (1957–2021), American basketball player
 Mark Eaton (ice hockey) (born 1977), American ice hockey player
 Nate Eaton (born 1996), American baseball player
 Stephen Eaton (born 1975), Australian paralympic athlete
 Steve Eaton, football (soccer) player (Tranmere Rovers)
 Zeb Eaton (1920–1989), American baseball player

Other 
 Elizabeth Eaton (born 1955) presiding bishop, Evangelical Lutheran Church in America
 Francis Eaton (Mayflower passenger)
 Gai Eaton (1921–2010), British diplomat, writer, historian, and Sufist Islamic scholar
 Samuel Eaton (1596?–1665), English independent divine
 Seymour Eaton (1859–1916), author, publisher and educator
 Warren Samuel Eaton (1891–1966), American aviator

See also 
 Eaton (disambiguation)
 Eton (surname)

English-language surnames
English toponymic surnames